The destruction of musical instruments is an act performed by a few pop, rock and other musicians during live performances, particularly at the end of the gig.

Early years
In 1956, on the Lawrence Welk Show, a zoot-suited performer billed as "Rockin' Rocky Rockwell" did a mocking rendition of Elvis Presley's hit song "Hound Dog." At the conclusion of the song he smashed an acoustic guitar over his knee. US country musician Ira Louvin was famous for smashing mandolins that he deemed out-of-tune.

Jerry Lee Lewis may be the first rock artist to have destroyed his equipment on stage, with several, possibly erroneous, stories of him destroying and burning pianos in the 1950s. Several contemporary musicians, including Annea Lockwood, Yōsuke Yamashita, and Diego Stocco, have incorporated piano burning in their compositions.

Jazz musician Charles Mingus, known for his fiery temper, reportedly smashed his $20,000 bass onstage in response to audience hecklers at New York's Five Spot.

Nam June Paik's "One for Violin Solo", performed on 16 June 1962, featured Paik very slowly and intently lifting a violin, then smashing it with one blow on a table.

In London, 1966, a group of artists from around the world came together to participate in the first Destruction in Art Symposium (DIAS). According to the event's press release, the principal objective of DIAS was "to focus attention on the element of destruction in Happenings and other art forms, and to relate this destruction in society." Two events were scheduled to occur throughout London. During the course of the symposium, Raphael Montañez Ortiz performed a series of seven public destruction events, including his piano destruction concerts, which were filmed by both American Broadcasting Company and the BBC. Two years later, New York City hosted the second Destruction in Art Symposium at Judson Church in Greenwich Village. The artists who gathered around this art movement and its development were opposed to the senseless destruction of human life and landscapes engendered by the Vietnam war.

During the Festival of Misfits in 1962, Fluxus-artist Robin Page performed his event named "Guitar Piece". Page threw his guitar off stage and kicked it out of the ICA’s front door and down Dover Street until it broke totally apart. This piece of performance art inspired guitarist Pete Townshend of the Who, who was the first guitar-smashing rock artist. Rolling Stone Magazine included his smashing of a Rickenbacker guitar at the Railway Tavern in Harrow and Wealdstone in September 1964 in their list of "50 Moments That Changed Rock & Roll". A student of Gustav Metzger, Townshend saw his guitar smashing as a kind of auto-destructive art.

Keith Moon, the Who's drummer and Townshend's bandmate, was also known for destroying his drum set. The most famous episode of this occurred during the Who's debut on U.S. television on the Smothers Brothers Comedy Hour in 1967. Moon overloaded his bass drum with explosive charges which were detonated during the finale of the song, "My Generation." The explosion caused guest Bette Davis to faint, set Pete Townshend's hair on fire and, according to legend, contributed to his later partial deafness and tinnitus. Moon was also injured in the explosion when shrapnel from the cymbals cut his arm. VH1 later placed this event at number ten on their list of the twenty Greatest Rock and Roll Moments on Television.

Jeff Beck, then a member of the Yardbirds, reluctantly destroyed a guitar in the 1966 film Blowup after being told to emulate the Who by director Michelangelo Antonioni. Jimi Hendrix was also known for destroying his guitars and amps. He famously burned two guitars at three shows, most notably the 1967 Monterey Pop Festival. In an effort to out-do the Who's destruction of their instruments earlier at the same event, Hendrix poured lighter fluid over his guitar and set it on fire, even though "I'd just finished painting it that day" as he would later remark. In 2004, Rolling Stone Magazine included this in their list of "50 Moments That Changed Rock & Roll" alongside Townshend's first guitar smashing in 1964.

Instrument destruction has also featured in other musical genres than pop and rock music. Towards the end of Peter Maxwell Davies's monodrama Eight Songs for a Mad King, first performed in 1969, the vocalist seizes the violin from one of the musicians and smashes it.

Later examples
In 1968, a piano was dropped from a helicopter near Seattle, Washington to publicize an outdoor concert. In 2019, the piano was exhumed by Jack Straw Cultural Center and displayed in a gallery. Several local composers and musicians performed on the recovered instrument.

Ritchie Blackmore of Deep Purple and Rainbow smashed guitars in performance throughout the 1970s.

Paul Simonon of the Clash famously destroyed his Fender Precision Bass only once at the side of the stage, out of frustration over the bouncers at the show not allowing the audience to stand up from their seats. A photograph taken by Pennie Smith of the event became the iconic cover to their London Calling album.

In 1991, country artist Garth Brooks and then-band-member Ty England smashed their acoustic guitars at the end of "Friends In Low Places" at the Reunion Arena in Dallas, Texas.

Kurt Cobain and the members of Nirvana also smashed guitars and other equipment at performances throughout the band's career, ranging from the late 1980s through the early 1990s. Cobain's wife, Courtney Love, the frontwoman of Hole, also sometimes destroyed her guitars onstage, as well as smashing microphones, pushing over amplifier stacks, and dismantling drum kits.

Nine Inch Nails were famous for destroying any instruments, and also sound equipment, that failed on stage, with their 1991 Lollapalooza tour having ten guitars smashed every concert, as well as Trent Reznor either throwing Yamaha DX7 keyboards or using his boot to remove its keys. A guitar technician on their Self Destruct Tour estimated 137 Gibson Les Pauls were wrecked during those concerts.

Matthew Bellamy of Muse has the Guinness world record at breaking the most guitars in one tour, with 140.

In the famous toga party scene in the movie National Lampoon's Animal House, John Belushi's character Bluto comes across a folk singer (portrayed by singer-songwriter Stephen Bishop, who is credited as "Charming Guy With Guitar") performing "The Riddle Song" for a group of college girls. Bluto abruptly takes the singer's acoustic guitar out of his hands and smashes it against the wall, then hands a splintered piece of it back, simply saying "Sorry."

In 2007, Win Butler of Arcade Fire destroyed an acoustic guitar at the end of a live performance of "Intervention" on Saturday Night Live, after a string had broken during the performance.

In 2012, Green Day frontman Billie Joe Armstrong destroyed his guitar and Mike Dirnt destroyed his bass at the end of a live performance of iHeartRadio music festival in Las Vegas out of frustration at not being given enough time for his performance.

In 2021, Phoebe Bridgers smashed her Danelectro guitar against a stage wedge during her live performance of "I Know The End" on Saturday Night Live.

See also
Shock rock
Piano burning

References

Rock music
Guitars